These 149 species belong to Wyeomyia, a genus of mosquitoes in the family Culicidae.

Wyeomyia species

 Wyeomyia abebela Dyar and Knab, 1908 i c g
 Wyeomyia ablechra Dyar & Knab, 1908 c g
 Wyeomyia adelpha Dyar & Knab, 1906 c g
 Wyeomyia aequatoriana Levi-castillo, 1954 i
 Wyeomyia aequatorianna Levi-Castillo, 1954 c g
 Wyeomyia airosai Lane & Cerqueria, 1942 c g
 Wyeomyia alani Lane and Cerqueira, 1957 i c g
 Wyeomyia albosquamata Bonne-Wepster & Bonne, 1919 c g
 Wyeomyia amazonica Levi-castillo, 1954 i c g
 Wyeomyia aningae Motta & Lourenco-de-Oliveira, 2005 c g
 Wyeomyia antillarum Floch and Abonnenc, 1945 i
 Wyeomyia antunesi Lane & Guimaraes, 1937 c g
 Wyeomyia aphobema Dyar, 1918 i c g
 Wyeomyia aporonoma Dyar & Knab, 1906 c g
 Wyeomyia arborea Galindo, 1951 i c g
 Wyeomyia argenteorostris (Bonne-Wepster & Bonne, 1920) c g
 Wyeomyia arthrostigma (Lutz, 1905) i c g
 Wyeomyia atrata Belkin & Heinemann, 1970 c g
 Wyeomyia autocratica Dyar & Knab, 1906 c g
 Wyeomyia bahama Dyar and Knab, 1906 i c g
 Wyeomyia bicornis (Root, 1928) i c g
 Wyeomyia bonnei Lane & Cerqueira, 1942 c g
 Wyeomyia bourrouli (Lutz, 1905) c g
 Wyeomyia caracula Dyarand Nunez Tovar, 1927 i c g
 Wyeomyia carrilloi (Sutil & Pulido, 1978) c g
 Wyeomyia celaenocephala Dyar and Knab, 1906 i c g
 Wyeomyia cesari Ponte & Cerqueira, 1938 c g
 Wyeomyia chalcocephala Dyar & Knab, 1906 c g
 Wyeomyia charmion Dyar, 1928 i c g
 Wyeomyia chocoensis Porter & Wolff, 2004 c g
 Wyeomyia circumcincta Dyar & Knab, 1907 c g
 Wyeomyia clasoleuca Dyar & Knab, 1908 c g
 Wyeomyia codiocampa Dyar and Knab, 1907 i c g
 Wyeomyia coenonus Howard, Dyar & Knab, 1913 c g
 Wyeomyia colombiana Lane, 1945 i c g
 Wyeomyia complosa (Dyar, 1928) c g
 Wyeomyia compta Senevet & Abonnenc, 1939 c g
 Wyeomyia confusa (Lutz, 1905) c g
 Wyeomyia corona Belkin & Heinemann, 1970 c g
 Wyeomyia covagarciai Sutil Oramas & Pulido F., 1974 c g
 Wyeomyia davisi Lane & Cerqueira, 1942 c g
 Wyeomyia deanei Oliveira, 1983 c g
 Wyeomyia diabolica Lane & Forattini, 1952 c g
 Wyeomyia downsi Lane, 1945 i c g
 Wyeomyia dyari Lane and Cerqueira, 1942 i c g
 Wyeomyia edwardsi Lane & Cerqueira, 1942 c g
 Wyeomyia esmeraldasi Levi-Castillo, 1955 c g
 Wyeomyia felicia (Dyar & Nunez Tovar, 1927) c g
 Wyeomyia fernandezyepezi Cova Garcia, Sutil Oramas, & Pulido F., 1974 c g
 Wyeomyia finlayi Lane & Cerqueria, 1942 c g
 Wyeomyia fishi Zavortink, 1986 c g
 Wyeomyia flabellata Lane & Cerqueira, 1942 c g
 Wyeomyia flavifacies Edwards, 1922 i c g
 Wyeomyia florestan Dyar, 1925 i c g
 Wyeomyia flui (Bonne-Wepster & Bonne, 1919) c g
 Wyeomyia forattinii Clastrier, 1974 c g
 Wyeomyia forcipenis Lourenco-de-Oliveira & Silva, 1985 c g
 Wyeomyia fuscipes Edwards, 1922 c g
 Wyeomyia galvaoi Correa & Ramalho, 1956 c g
 Wyeomyia gaudians Dyar & Nunez Tovar, 1927 c g
 Wyeomyia gausapata Dyar and Nunez Tovar, 1927 i c g
 Wyeomyia grayii Theobald, 1901 c g
 Wyeomyia guadians Dyar and Nunez Tovar, 1927 i g
 Wyeomyia guatemala Dyar & Knab, 1906 c g
 Wyeomyia gutierrezi Duret, 1971 c g
 Wyeomyia haynei Dodge, 1947 i c g
 Wyeomyia hemisagnosta Dyar and Knab, 1906 i c g
 Wyeomyia hirsuta (Hill and Hill, 1946) i c g
 Wyeomyia hosautos Dyar and Knab, 1907 i c g
 Wyeomyia howardi Lane & Cerqueira, 1942 c g
 Wyeomyia incaudata Root, 1928 c g
 Wyeomyia ininicola Fauran, 1974 c g
 Wyeomyia intonca Dyar & Knab, 1909 c g
 Wyeomyia juxtahirsuta Belkin & Heinemann, 1970 c g
 Wyeomyia knabi Lane & Cerqueria, 1942 c g
 Wyeomyia kummi Lane and Cerqueira, 1942 i c g
 Wyeomyia labesba Howard, Dyar & Knab, 1913 c g
 Wyeomyia lamellata (Bonne-Wepster & Bonne, 1919) c g
 Wyeomyia lassalli (Bonne-Wepster & Bonne, 1921) c g
 Wyeomyia lateralis Petrocchi, 1927 i c g
 Wyeomyia leucostigma Lutz, 1904 i c g
 Wyeomyia leucotarsis Lane, 1936 c g
 Wyeomyia limai Lane & Cerqueira, 1942 c g
 Wyeomyia longirostris Theobald, 1901 c g
 Wyeomyia lopesi Correa & Ramalho, 1956 c g
 Wyeomyia lopezii Cova Garcia, Sutil Oramas, & Pulido F., 1974 c g
 Wyeomyia luna Belkin & Heinemann, 1970 c g
 Wyeomyia luteoventralis Theobald, 1901 i c g
 Wyeomyia lutzi (Lima, 1904) i c g
 Wyeomyia malonopus Dyar, 1919 i g
 Wyeomyia mattinglyi Lane, 1953 i c g
 Wyeomyia medioalbipes Lutz, 1904 i c g
 Wyeomyia melanocephala Dyar and Knab, 1906 i c g
 Wyeomyia melanopus Dyar, 1919 c g
 Wyeomyia mitchellii (Theobald, 1905) i c g b  (bromeliad mosquito)
 Wyeomyia moerbista (Dyar and Knab, 1919) i c g
 Wyeomyia muehlensi Petrocchi, 1927 c g
 Wyeomyia mystes Dyar, 1924 i c g
 Wyeomyia negrensis Gordon and Evans, 1922 i c g
 Wyeomyia nigricephala Clastrier & Claustre, 1978 c g
 Wyeomyia nigritubus Galindo, Carpenter, Trapido, 1951 i c g
 Wyeomyia nunezia Dyar, 1928 i g
 Wyeomyia oblita (Lutz, 1904) i c g
 Wyeomyia occulta Bonne-wepster and Bonne, 1919 i c g
 Wyeomyia pallidoventer Theobald, 1907 c g
 Wyeomyia palmata Lane & Cerqueira, 1942 c g
 Wyeomyia pampithes (Dyar and Nunez Tovar, 1928) i c g
 Wyeomyia personata (Lutz, 1904) i
 Wyeomyia pertinans (Williston, 1896) i c g
 Wyeomyia petrocchiae (Shannon and Del Ponte, 1927) i
 Wyeomyia phroso Howard, Dyar, Knab, 1915 i c g
 Wyeomyia pilicauda Root, 1928 c g
 Wyeomyia pseudopecten Dyar and Knab, 1906 i c g
 Wyeomyia pseudorobusta Pajot & Fauran, 1975 c g
 Wyeomyia quasilongirostris Theobald, 1907 c g
 Wyeomyia quasiluteoventralis (Theobald, 1903) i
 Wyeomyia robusta Senevet and Abonnenc, 1939 i c g
 Wyeomyia rooti (Del Ponte, 1939) i c g
 Wyeomyia rorotai Senevet & Chabelard, 1942 c g
 Wyeomyia roucouyana (Bonne-wepster and Bonne, 1927) i c g
 Wyeomyia sabethea Lane and Cerqueira, 1842 i c g
 Wyeomyia schnusei (Martini, 1931) i
 Wyeomyia scotinomus (Dyar and Knab, 1907) i c g
 Wyeomyia serrata (Lutz, 1905) i c g
 Wyeomyia serratoria (Dyar and Nunez Tovar, 1927) i c g
 Wyeomyia shannoni Lane and Cerqueira, 1942 i c g
 Wyeomyia simmsi Dyar and Knab, 1908) i c g
 Wyeomyia smithii (Coquillett, 1901) i c g b  (pitcherplant mosquito)
 Wyeomyia sororcula Dyar & Knab, 1906 c g
 Wyeomyia splendida Bonne-Wepster & Bonne, 1919 c g
 Wyeomyia staminifera Lourenco-de-Oliveira, Motta & de Castro, 1992 c g
 Wyeomyia stellata Belkin & Heinemann, 1970 c g
 Wyeomyia stonei Vargas, Martinez, Palacios, 1953 i c g
 Wyeomyia subcomplosa (Del Ponte, 1939) i c g
 Wyeomyia surinamensis Bruijning, 1959 c g
 Wyeomyia tarsata Lane and Cerqueira, 1942 i c g
 Wyeomyia taurepana Anduze, 1941 i c g
 Wyeomyia telestica Dyar and Knab, 1906 i
 Wyeomyia testei Senevet and Abonnenc, 1939 i c g
 Wyeomyia theobaldi Lane & Cerqueira, 1942 c g
 Wyeomyia trifurcata Clastrier, 1973 c g
 Wyeomyia trinidadensis Theobald, 1901 c g
 Wyeomyia tripartita (Bonne-Wepster & Bonne, 1921) c g
 Wyeomyia trujilloi Pulido F. & Sutil O., 1981 c g
 Wyeomyia ulocoma (Theobald, 1903) i c g
 Wyeomyia undulata Del Ponte and Cerqueira, 1938 i c g
 Wyeomyia vanduzeei Dyar & Knab, 1906 i c g b
 Wyeomyia ypsipola Dyar, 1922 i c g
 Wyeomyia zinzala Zavortink, 1986 c g

Data sources: i = ITIS, c = Catalogue of Life, g = GBIF, b = Bugguide.net

References

Wyeomyia